Acraea caecilia, the pink acraea, is a butterfly in the family Nymphalidae. It is found in Senegal, Gambia, Guinea-Bissau, Guinea, Mali, Sierra Leone, Liberia, Ivory Coast, Burkina Faso, Ghana, Togo, Benin, Nigeria, Chad, Sudan, the Democratic Republic of the Congo, Ethiopia, Uganda, Kenya, Tanzania and Malawi.

Description

A. caecilia F. is similar to the preceding species, [ Acraea natalica but on an average smaller (expanse 56 to 70 mm.) and differs in having the discal dots in cellules 4 to 6 of the forewing smaller, rounder and further removed from the apex of the cell; the forewing has 2 to 4 submarginal dots (in lb to 4). Ground-colour above light reddish yellow to salmon-colour; base of both wings and apex of the fore wing black for the same extent as in natalica ; hindwing above always with sharply defined black marginal band about 2 mm. in breadth, not or 
indistinctly spotted; under surface as in natalica, but the red spots on the hindwing indistinct. Senegal to Nigeria; Nubia; Uganda; Abyssinia; Somaliland; British and German East Africa.- female ab. artemisa Stoll has the ground-colour above white, with the black markings much widened. West Africa ? - female ab. hypatia Drury only differs in the darker, redder ground-colour of the upper surface. Sierra Leone. - pudora Auriv. (55 g) is an eastern race, in which the black colour at the apex of the forewing is only very narrow and does not- cover the base of cellules 7 and 8. German and British East Africa. - ab. umbrina Auriv. only 
differs from pudora in the forewing above having between veins 2 and 5 or 6 a grey, semitransparent submarginal nebulous band.

Subspecies
A. c. caecilia — Senegal, Gambia, Guinea-Bissau, Guinea, Mali, Sierra Leone, Liberia, Ivory Coast, Burkina Faso, Ghana, Togo, Benin, northern Nigeria, Chad, southern Sudan, northern Democratic Republic of the Congo, Ethiopia, Uganda, western Kenya, north-western Tanzania
A. c. kulal van Someren, 1936 — Kenya: north to Mount Kulal and Mount Marsabit
A. c. pudora Aurivillius, 1910 — eastern Kenya, eastern and central Tanzania, northern Malawi

Biology
The habitat consists of savanna and dry thornbush.

The larvae feed on Wormskioldia (including W. pilosa) and Adenia species (including A. cissampeloides).

Taxonomy
It is a member of the Acraea caecilia species group. See also Pierre & Bernaud, 2014.

References

External links

Die Gross-Schmetterlinge der Erde 13: Die Afrikanischen Tagfalter. Plate XIII 55 g ssp. pudora
Images representing Acraea caecilia at Bold
Acraea caecilia caecilia at Pteron

Butterflies described in 1781
caecilia